This article displays the qualifying draw of the 2011 Grand Prix Hassan II.

Players

Seeds

Qualifiers

Qualifying draw

First qualifier

Second qualifier

Third qualifier

Fourth qualifier

References
 Qualifying Draw

Grand Prix Hassan II - Qualifying
2011 Grand Prix Hassan II